Neogagrella is a genus of harvestmen in the family Sclerosomatidae from South and Southeast Asia.

Species
 Neogagrella balica Roewer, 1931
 Neogagrella barnesi Roewer, 1929
 Neogagrella eximia Roewer, 1913

References

Harvestmen
Harvestman genera